Jub Clerc is a Nyulnyul and Yawuru film director and screenwriter from Australia. She is most noted for her 2022 debut feature film Sweet As, which won the Innovation Award at the 2022 Melbourne International Film Festival, and the NETPAC Award for best film from the Asia/Pacific region att he 2022 Toronto International Film Festival.

She has also directed the short films Storytime, Abbreviation and Min Min Light, and episodes of the television series The Heights.

References

External links

21st-century Australian screenwriters
21st-century Australian women writers
Australian film directors
Australian women film directors
Australian women screenwriters
Australian television directors
Australian women television directors
Indigenous Australian filmmakers
Indigenous Australian writers
Living people
Year of birth missing (living people)